The Belle Isle Aquarium is a public aquarium located in Belle Isle Park in Detroit, Michigan. Designed by noted architects George D. Mason and Albert Kahn, it opened on August 18, 1904, and was the oldest continually operating public aquarium in North America when it closed on April 3, 2005. The aquarium reopened to the public on August 18, 2012, and is now run entirely by volunteers. The  historic building features a single large gallery with an arched ceiling covered in green glass tile to evoke an underwater feeling.

The aquarium was operated by the Detroit Zoological Society prior to the 2005 closure. It is currently operated by the Belle Isle Conservancy.

History

The Belle Isle Aquarium opened on 18 August 1904. According to the address given at the opening ceremony, when it opened it was the third largest aquarium in the world.

The aquarium basement served as a speakeasy during Prohibition and later held large fish which no longer fit the Belle Isle Zoo's gallery tanks. Closed circuit television allowed remote viewing of these fish. The aquarium was slightly remodeled in the 1950s.

Attendance was on a declining trend in the final decade of its first run: 113,000 visitors toured the aquarium in 1995, but only 56,000 in 2004.

On 14 January 2005, the city of Detroit announced that the aquarium would be closed to save $530,000 annually, with the staff being reassigned to the Detroit Zoo or the Belle Isle Zoo, and the fish transferred to other aquariums. It was originally scheduled to close on March 1. Although an extension was granted to the Friends of Belle Isle Aquarium to come up with a fund raising plan, the aquarium was closed on April 3, 2005.

On August 3, 2005, Detroit citizens voted to reopen the aquarium by an overwhelming margin (88% in favor, 12% opposed). However, the vote was non-binding and the aquarium remained closed. In 2010, supporters of the aquarium were still trying to find donors to help defray the building's operating costs.

Although the building was closed between 2005 and 2012, goldfish and koi from an outside pond were housed in the aquarium during the winter. Each year in February, the aquarium opened for a day for the annual "Shiver on the River," a fund raising event to promote public support of Belle Isle non-profit groups including the Friends of Belle Isle Aquarium.

On 14 August 2012, The Belle Isle Conservancy, a non-profit volunteer group established in 2011 from the merger of the Friends of Belle Isle Aquarium and other Belle Isle non-profit groups, announced the re-opening of the aquarium on a limited basis. The aquarium was reopened on 18 August 2012, the 108th anniversary of its opening. Since 15 September 2012 the volunteer-run aquarium has been open on Saturdays from 10:00 am – 3:00 pm.

Animals

The aquarium largely featured freshwater species native to the Great Lakes region, but also had salt-water species from around the world. Currently the aquarium is operating with a limited collection of fish species, as volunteers are still working to restore the aquarium.

The aquarium made news in 2002 when one of its female white-spotted bamboo sharks gave birth to two young despite not having been near a male in six years, in a suspected rare case of parthenogenesis.

Conservation
The Belle Isle Aquarium participated in breeding programs for several endangered species.

The future
Volunteers are working to restore sixty of the aquarium's tanks, some of which have been open since the fall of 2012.

References

External links

Friends of Belle Isle Aquarium
Friends of Belle Isle
Inside the Belle Isle Aquarium at Detroiturbex.com
Historic Detroit — Belle Isle Aquarium

Aquaria in Michigan
1904 establishments in Michigan
Buildings and structures completed in 1904
Educational buildings in Detroit
Belle Isle Park (Michigan)